Rimba Racer is a Malaysian computer-animated streaming television series created by Glue Studios. The series follows a young, aspiring racer named Tag who enters the prestigious auto racing league, the Rimba Grand Prix, to fulfill his dream of racing, but also discovers a conspiracy in its midst and collaborates with other racers to unravel the subversive forces behind the sport. Rimba Racer is Malaysia's first anthropomorphic themed cartoon. Its first episode premiered on 25 December 2014 on Nickelodeon India before its airing in its home country on TV3. This animation is currently airing on TV9.

The show is noted as one of the success stories of local Malaysian animation startups.

Premise

Setting 
The series is set in a fictional modern-day world of anthropomorphic animals, and focuses on the Rimba Grand Prix (RGP), a professional racing competition involving drivers in high-tech vehicles. Each vehicle is equipped with a special ability that allows the driver to gain the advantage or inhibit opponents, but can only be used once per race. These special abilities are unique to each vehicle and the driver. For example, the Thunder Strike ability allows Tag's car to leap into the air over a small distance, and Axle's car, the Falcon Mach-1, uses hyperspeed for a brief burst of acceleration.

Most of the narrative takes place aboard an expansive RGP-branded airship The Ark, which ferries the racers and their cars, along with RGP officials and crews, to locations across the world. In addition to living quarters for the racers, the ship features servicing garages for each vehicle complete with a fuel pump, large computer monitors, and an elevator that transports the car directly to a launch hangar below deck. There are also TV broadcasting studios, a luxury lounge, an executive office, and a simulation room, among other onboard amenities. In the second season, the ship is retrofitted with a virtual racing facility lined with pods for each racer for competing on virtual tracks, but has been used at least once in the series.

Synopsis 
Season 1 opens with a 21-year-old street-racing prodigy named Tag who pilots the Ripper, a race car inherited from his father, legendary racer Riq the Ripper who died in a racing accident thirteen years prior. He lives in poverty with Miles, a mechanic and his personal guardian. Tag and Miles are soon recruited to the RGP by King, head of the organization. Tag eagerly joins the race, which consists of Sonny, Meika, Meelo, Tamira, Krom, Wrecks, Cuckoo, Ooaa, and repeat racing champion Axle. Tag initially struggles in the races and confronts difficulties of being accepted by the other racers, except for Sonny, Meika, and Meelo whom he quickly befriends. Eventually, however, his improving performance on the track makes him a public sensation, and the media dubs him the "Super Rookie."

Tag and Miles become suspicious when King offers them a personal financial backing in exchange for their loyalty. This is vindicated when King instructs Tamira to sideline Tag from a race as reprisal for rejecting the offer. Tag and Miles conclude that King is scripting the races with drivers and enlist Sonny, Meika, and Meelo to take him on for his actions. Anticipating this, King orchestrates a team race during which the Ripper is totaled, and Sonny is rendered comatose. Dejected by the chain of events, Tag resigns from the RGP in protest, causing the public to distrust King. Meanwhile, Tamira, who has been feigning alliance with King, attempts to steal incriminating data from his office computer, but she is spotted and flees. Pursued by King's henchmen, she goes into hiding with a covert partner and gives Tag her money to repair his car, urging him to rejoin the RGP. Elsewhere, Sonny fully recovers from his injuries, and he, Meika, and Meelo assist Tag and Miles in successfully rebuilding the Ripper. Tag then returns to the races, much to King's chagrin.

Tag and his friends continue working together in the final race to prevent Axle from finishing in the lead. At the same time, Tamira and Miles sneak into the RPG headquarters building to steal a black box containing evidence of King's wrongdoings. On the final approach, Tag manages to stop Axle but crashes out in the process; this allows Tamira and Miles to escape with the black box. Axle retains his championship title, while Tag wins a silver medal. After the award ceremony, Tag and the others confront King over the black box and reach a pact requiring him to keep out of the races in exchange for withholding the evidence from the public. However, King reports this incident to his employers, the Ringmasters, who reprimand him and reveal that Meika has been in league with them all along. Later, Tamira brings Tag and Miles to her partner, who turns out to be Riq still alive after all these years.

In season 2, taking place six months later, Tag and Miles enter their second year with the RGP, which sees three newer recruits: Pike, Vyxx, and Xeno (Cuckoo, Ooaa, and Wrecks have since left the races). Despite their nascent position, the threesome fervently outperform the veteran racers. Worsening matters, Tag blames Miles for his father's supposed death, creating a dissension that causes his performance to suffer. Seeking to mend their relationship, Riq secretly meets with his son and Miles to explain that his accident was staged, and that he has since remained under cover to get close to those involved in the attempt on his life; Tag and Miles reconcile upon learning the truth.

Meanwhile, Meelo and Tamira make several unsuccessful attempts to access data about the Ringmasters in the black box, which Meika had secretly encrypted to protect their identities. Tag and his friends catch Meika trespassing in Meelo's private quarters where the black box is stashed, and realize her alliance with the Ringmasters. Riq also shares intelligence that Vyxx, Xeno, and Pike are in fact career criminals hired by them. Meika soon has a change of heart and tricks the Ringmasters into providing Meelo a cipher key needed to decode the files. However, Xeno's nanobots that she had unknowingly planted on the black box alert the trio to Meelo's hacking attempt, and they set the device to self-destruct, destroying all criminal evidence.

Now seeing Tag as an impediment, Pike pursues multiple methods of removing him from the tournament, such as falsely accusing him of racketeering and cheating, which prompts a formal investigation on him and his friends, and choreographing a race to annihilate him. Each effort fails because of King and Meika's intercession. At this point, the Ringmasters are wary of their treachery and assign Pike and Vyxx to closely monitor them.

Characters

Reception
Rimba Racer was first exported to Nickelodeon India on 25 December 2014. It received an award for best animation series at the 2015 Malaysian Film Festival. The first season of the series aired on Disney XD and Daily Motion on 27 September 2017. Season 2 premiered on YouTube before it aired on TV9 in Malaysia by 4 January 2019. So far, all 13 episodes of the first season have aired on Netflix. Rimba Racer has been positively received on IMDb with the rating at 8.3. The first season was aired in India on Nickelodeon Sonic and Nick HD+ in the year 2017.

In other media 
On 1 October 2016, Rimba Racer Rush: Endless Race mobile game was released by Spacepup Entertainment in collaboration with Glue Studios. The game currently has 100,000+ downloads on the Google Play Store.

References

External links
Official website version 2

Rimba Racer on Facebook
Rimba Racer on YouTube
Rimba Racer on Daily Motion
Rimba Racer on Netflix
Rimba Racer on Amazon Prime

2010s animated television series
Malaysian children's animated adventure television series
Malaysian children's animated comedy television series
Computer-animated television series
Animated television series about auto racing
Animated television series about foxes